is the main venue for the performing arts in Nagoya, Aichi Prefecture, Japan.

The center consists of:
Aichi Prefectural Museum
Aichi Prefectural Arts Theater
Main Hall
Concert Hall
Aichi Prefectural Arts Promotion Service
Aichi Prefectural Library

Oasis 21 is located right in front of the building.

The Aichi Art Center also hosts the fine arts exhibition Nitten.

See also 
Nagoya Philharmonic Orchestra

References

External links 

Opera houses in Japan
Buildings and structures in Nagoya
Museums in Nagoya
Concert halls in Japan
Theatres in Nagoya
Arts centres in Japan
Tourist attractions in Nagoya
Sakae, Nagoya